This is a list of dignitaries at the state memorial service of Nelson Mandela, the former President of South Africa. Mandela died on 5 December 2013. Many heads of state and government attended the state memorial service on Tuesday, 10 December 2013 at the FNB Stadium in Johannesburg. The memorial service was one of the largest gatherings of world leaders. It was also the largest funeral in the history of South Africa, and the African continent itself.

Two UN Secretary-Generals, the presidents of the European Council and European Commission, two French presidents, four United States presidents and four UK prime ministers attended the funeral service. In total, more than 500 VIP dignitaries from 19 supranational organizations and approximately 190 countries had arrived for this event. Some of the dignitaries later attended the burial ceremony on 15 December 2013 at Mandela's hometown, Qunu.

This memorial event was one of the largest in the world in terms of foreign leaders, surpassing the funeral of Pope John Paul II in 2005. It was itself surpassed by the state funeral of Queen Elizabeth II on 19 September 2022.

Dignitaries

Heads of state and government

Other royalty

Government representatives

International organisations

Former heads of state / government

Other guests

This section is a partial list of notable guests  who attended the memorial service.
Bono, Irish U2 vocalist and activist
Richard Branson, British businessman, founder of Virgin Group
Laura Bush, former First Lady, spouse of former US President George W. Bush
Naomi Campbell, British model
Chelsea Clinton, daughter of former US President Bill Clinton
Hillary Clinton, former US Secretary of State (Governmental representatives).
Peter Gabriel, British singer
Bill Gates, American businessman, founder and president of Microsoft
Jesse Jackson, American civil rights activist, minister, and politician
Henry Kissinger, former US Secretary of State (Governmental representatives).
Annie Lennox, British singer-songwriter
Francois Pienaar, South African rugby player
Charlize Theron, South African-American actress
Desmond Tutu, South African Anglican Archbishop
Oprah Winfrey, American television personality and actress

Non-attendance
: Former Chancellor Gerhard Schroeder, who frequently attended funerals of world leaders during his term of office, did not attend. Germany's former leaders did not usually attend world leaders' funerals.
: Iranian Foreign Minister Mohammad Javad Zarif was expected to attend the service but had to cancel his visit due to the visit of his Russian counterpart in Tehran.
: Prime Minister Binyamin Netanyahu did not attend the memorial service citing financial and security reasons.
: The ROC Ministry of Foreign Affairs decided to not send a delegation because of the time constraint. Instead, Foreign Minister David Lin personally visited the Liaison Office of South Africa to convey condolences over the death of Mandela. In addition, the Representative of the ROC to South Africa visited the Union Buildings in Pretoria to view the remains of Mandela and pay respects on behalf of the ROC government.
: Prime Minister Yingluck Shinawatra was expected to attend but declined due to ongoing protests against her government.
: The 14th Dalai Lama was expected to attend the service but was denied a visa by the South African government.
: Pope Francis was sent an invitation to attend either the memorial or state funeral. He did not attend either because it was against the tradition that Popes do not usually attend funerals of world leaders.
: President Trương Tấn Sang did not attend the service due to the time constraint. The country was represented by Đào Việt Trung, Chairman of the Presidential Office.

References

External links

 
 

Nelson Mandela
Mandela, Nelson